Daniel Aloysius McGee (September 29, 1911 – December 4, 1991) was a Major League Baseball player. He played seven games with the Boston Braves between July 14 and July 20, 1934.

References

External links

Boston Braves players
Major League Baseball shortstops
New Bedford Whalers (baseball) players
Harrisburg Senators players
Albany Senators players
Beckley Miners players
Galveston Buccaneers players
Baseball players from New York City
1911 births
1991 deaths
Burials at Gate of Heaven Cemetery (Hawthorne, New York)